Richa Rathore(born 29 January 1993) is an Indian actress who works in Hindi language TV shows. She is currently playing the role of Ghazal Rahmani in Zee TV's serial Rabb Se Hai Dua opposite Karanvir Sharma. She is best known for her work as Nandini in Aapki Nazron Ne Samjha. She has played the role of Neha Mehra in Kumkum Bhagya. She also appeared in a small role in the movie  Tamasha.

Filmography

Television

References 

Indian television actresses
1993 births
Living people
21st-century Indian actresses
Actresses in Hindi cinema